In 1990-1991 season, FK Sarajevo played in the Yugoslav First League and that was FK Sarajevo's 44th season in history.

Players

Squad

(Captain)

Statistics

Kit

Competitions

Yugoslav First League

League table

References

FK Sarajevo seasons
Sarajevo